Intergalactic dust is cosmic dust in between galaxies in intergalactic space. Evidence for intergalactic dust has been suggested as early as 1949, and study of it grew throughout the late 20th century. There are large variations in the distribution of intergalactic dust. The dust may affect intergalactic distance measurements, such as to supernovae and quasars in other galaxies.

Intergalactic dust can form intergalactic dust clouds, known since the 1960s to exist around some galaxies. By the 1980s, at least four intergalactic dust clouds had been discovered within several megaparsecs of the Milky Way galaxy, exemplified by the Okroy Cloud.

See also
 Astrochemistry
 Atomic and molecular astrophysics
 Cosmochemistry
 Extragalactic astronomy
 Extraterrestrial materials 
 Hypervelocity star 
 Intergalactic medium
 Intergalactic space
 Intergalactic star
 Interstellar medium
 List of interstellar and circumstellar molecules
 Warm–hot intergalactic medium

References

External links

Cosmic dust
Extragalactic astronomy
Intergalactic media